Summer Nights is an album by jazz guitarist Joe Pass that was released in 1990.

Reception

Writing for Allmusic, music critic Scott Yanow  wrote of the album "Although Joe Pass' main influence was Charlie Christian and he really does not sound like Reinhardt, he manages to evoke the spirit of Django while swinging in his own fashion. It is particularly nice hearing such tunes as "Belleville," the haunting "Tears" and "For Django" in newer versions."

Track listing

Personnel
 Joe Pass – acoustic guitar and electric guitar
 John Pisano – acoustic guitar
 Jim Hughart – bass
 Colin Bailey – drums

References

1989 albums
Joe Pass albums
Pablo Records albums